The Wales Co-operative Mercantile Institution, at 150 N. State St. in Wales, Utah, was built in 1894.  It was listed on the National Register of Historic Places in 2000.

It is a one-story Western false-front-style building.

It may also be known as Wales Commercial Mercantile.

References

National Register of Historic Places in Sanpete County, Utah
Victorian architecture in Utah
Western false front architecture
Buildings and structures completed in 1894